The 1970 French motorcycle Grand Prix was the second round of the 1970 Grand Prix motorcycle racing season. It took place on 17 May 1970 at the Circuit Bugatti Le Mans.

500 cc classification

250 cc classification

125 cc classification

50 cc classification

Sidecar classification

References

Motorcycle Grand Prix
French
French motorcycle Grand Prix